TeamNL is an umbrella organization of Dutch sports associations. The affiliated associations are:

References

External links
  

Sports organisations of the Netherlands
Dutch brands